A Moment of Weakness (Egyptian Arabic: لحظة ضعف, translit. Lahzet Da'af) is a 1981 Egyptian drama film written by Mahmoud Abu Zeid and directed by Sayed Tantawy. It stars Salah Zulfikar, Nelly and Hussein Fahmy.

Plot 
Abdul Ghaffar outrages against his wife, Saneya, when he discovers that Sahar is not his daughter, but rather as a result of a sinful relationship with Saneya before her marriage to him. To Egypt, it turns out that Abdul Ghaffar has assigned Sharif the task of returning Sahar after he regrets and is convinced that she is a victim, Sharif asks Abdul Ghaffar to keep his mission secret from Sahar and bless their marriage.

Crew 
 Director: Sayed Tantawy
 Screenplay: Mahmoud Abu Zeid
 Studio: Fouad El-Alfy Films
 Distributor: Ihab El-Leithy Films
 Soundtrack: Hussein El Imam, Moody El Imam
 Cinematographer: Moustafa Emam

Cast 
 Salah Zulfikar as Abdul Ghaffar Lutfi
 Nelly as Saneya/Sahar
 Hussein Fahmy as Sharif Farid
 Soher El Bably as Lola
 Salama Elias as Khalil Hamdi the lawyer
 Kadriye Kamel as the mother of Shafaat
 Lamia Yousry as Sahar
 Taghreed Abdel Hamid as Shafa'at
 Abdul-Moneim Al-Nimr as Sayed

See also 
 Egyptian cinema
 Salah Zulfikar filmography
 List of Egyptian films of 1981
 List of Egyptian films of the 1980s

References

External links 

 A Moment of Weakness on elCinema
 

1981 films
1980s Arabic-language films
20th-century Egyptian films
Egyptian drama films
Films shot in Egypt